Honey is an album by American jazz organist Jimmy McGriff featuring McGriff's performances of contemporary soul music hits recorded in 1968 and first released on the Solid State label.

Reception
AllMusic gave the album 3 stars.

Track listing
 "(Sweet Sweet Baby) Since You've Been Gone" (Aretha Franklin, Teddy White) - 2:22
 "Respect" (Otis Redding) - 2:03
 "Chain of Fools" (Don Covay) - 3:37
 "We're a Winner" (Curtis Mayfield) - 2:06
 "Up, Up and Away" (Jimmy Webb) - 2:45
 "Tell Mama" (Clarence Carter) - 2:15
 "Honey" (Bobby Russell) - 2:30
 "I Thank You" (David Porter, Isaac Hayes) - 2:04
 "I Got the Feelin'" (James Brown) - 2:10
 "Baby, I Love You" (Jeff Barry, Ellie Greenwich, Phil Spector) - 2:46
 "(Sittin' On) The Dock of the Bay" (Steve Cropper, Otis Redding) - 2:09

Personnel
Jimmy McGriff - organ
Uncredited musicians - trumpet, trombone, alto saxophone, tenor saxophone, baritone saxophone, guitar, electric bass, drums

References

Solid State Records (jazz label) albums
Jimmy McGriff albums
1968 albums
Albums produced by Sonny Lester